A sleeve tattoo or tattoo sleeve is a large tattoo or collection of smaller tattoos that covers most or all of a person's arm. There is a difference between an arm covered in tattoos and a sleeve tattoo: a sleeve tattoo has a unified theme, whereas an arm covered in tattoos may have many tattoos of different styles that does not have an overall unity. Tattoo sleeves will also often have overlapping or interlinking pieces.

The term "sleeve" is a reference to the tattoo's size similarity in coverage to a shirt sleeve on an article of clothing. Just like for shirts, there are various sizes of sleeves. In this manner, the term is also used as a verb; for example, "being sleeved" means to have one's entire arm tattooed. The term is also sometimes used in reference to a large leg tattoo that covers a person's leg in a similar manner.

The most common sleeve tattoo is a full sleeve, which covers the arm entirely in tattoos from the shoulder to the wrist. Other variations of sleeves are the half-sleeve and quarter-sleeve. These tattoos only cover part of the arm, usually above the elbow, but half-sleeves can also be found on the forearm from the wrist to the elbow. A quarter-sleeve usually covers only the shoulder to midway to the elbow. The quarter-sleeve is not often seen because it is so high on the arm; for that reason, individuals may choose to get a quarter-sleeve so it can be covered with a short-sleeved shirt.

Sleeve tattoos are usually a collaboration between a tattoo artist and customer to demonstrate a personal and unified artistic theme. Other times, a sleeve is created when a person has many smaller but separate tattoos on their arm and later has them connected with a unified background design to form a sleeve. Planned sleeves generally require many long hours of tattooing and can take weeks, months, or years to complete depending on if an individual wants to take the approach of one large design or smaller ones that interconnect.

Some organizations have proposed rules banning sleeves among their members; the U.S. Marines, for example, prohibited their recruits from getting sleeve tattoos on their arms or legs beginning on April 1, 2007 which ended October 29, 2021. Those with sleeves who were already serving prior to this date were protected under a grandfather clause. The U.S. Marines posted changes to this policy October 29, 2021, including a removal of a ban on sleeve tattoos. Although some organizations have created these bans, tattoo sleeves have become so popular that several clothing companies have produced apparel that simulates the look of tattoo sleeves using transparent mesh fabric printed with tattoo designs. These sleeves can provide a temporary feeling of having a sleeve and help someone decide if it is something they truly want. Additionally, these companies find customers in children and teenagers who may want to mimic someone they idolize or wear the sleeves for a costume.

Some sleeve tattoos run beyond the length of the shoulder and onto the chest. This is a specific Japanese styled sleeve called a Hikae. When both arms are completely tattooed as part of a full body tattoo, these are usually called sleeve tattoos. Sleeve tattoos which are often made with objects representing a feeling or culture such as skulls, weapons, flowers, or wolves.

See also
Full body tattoo

References

Tattooing by body part
Arm